James Milnes Gaskell (19 October 1810 – 5 February 1873) was a British Conservative politician.

James Milnes-Gaskell was the only child of Benjamin Gaskell (1781–1856) of Thornes House, Wakefield, West Yorkshire and Clifton Hall, Lancashire. He was born on 19 October 1810 and was educated at Eton College and Christ Church, Oxford.  His political interest may have been influenced by meeting lifelong friend William Ewart Gladstone as a school contemporary, and receiving visits during term from George Canning.  An uncle, Daniel Gaskell, also entered Parliament as first M.P. for Wakefield in 1832, at same general election as James.

It was at Gaskell's then home in Tilney Street, London, in 1834, that Gladstone met his future wife, Catherine Glynne.

He was M.P. for Wenlock in Shropshire from 1832 until retiring in 1868.  He served as a Lord of the Treasury from 1841 to 11 March 1846 under Sir Robert Peel's administration.

In 1832 he married Mary Wynn, daughter of the Rt Hon. Charles Williams-Wynn, (also a Member of Parliament) and they had two sons and two daughters. One son, Charles Milnes Gaskell, also became a Member of Parliament, as a Liberal.

It was from his wife's cousin, Sir Watkin Williams-Wynn, that Gaskell bought in 1857 the site of Wenlock Priory, whose ruins he restored and whose Prior's Lodge he made into a family home.

He died at 28 Norfolk Street, Park Lane, London on 5 February 1873, aged sixty-two, and was buried in the parish churchyard at Much Wenlock.

References

1810 births
1873 deaths
People educated at Eton College
Alumni of Christ Church, Oxford
Conservative Party (UK) MPs for English constituencies
UK MPs 1832–1835
UK MPs 1835–1837
UK MPs 1837–1841
UK MPs 1841–1847
UK MPs 1847–1852
UK MPs 1852–1857
UK MPs 1857–1859
UK MPs 1859–1865
UK MPs 1865–1868
Presidents of the Oxford Union